Pierres is a commune in the Eure-et-Loir department in northern France.

With the neighbouring commune of Maintenon, they form an urban satellite of Paris of 7,143 inhabitants (2018).

Population

See also
Communes of the Eure-et-Loir department

References

Communes of Eure-et-Loir